Josef Frank (25 February 1909, Prostějov - 3 December 1952, Prague) was a Czechoslovakian Communist politician.

Between 1939 and 1945 he was imprisoned in Buchenwald concentration camp.

In 1952 he was expelled from the party. He was subsequently arrested and sentenced to death by hanging in the Slánský trial, a show trial orchestrated from Moscow. In 1968 he was made a Hero of the Czechoslovak Socialist Republic in memoriam.

Frank is the central character of Howard Brenton's 1976 play Weapons of Happiness, in which he is imagined not dead, but rather living in exile.

Notes

1909 births
1952 deaths
Politicians from Prostějov
People from the Margraviate of Moravia
Members of the Central Committee of the Communist Party of Czechoslovakia
Members of the National Assembly of Czechoslovakia (1948–1954)
Buchenwald concentration camp survivors
Slánský trial defendants
Executed Czech people
People executed by the Czechoslovak Socialist Republic by hanging
Heroes of the Czechoslovak Socialist Republic